Sequoyah High School (also known as Sequoyah-Tahlequah) is a Native American boarding school serving students in grades 7 through 12, who are members of a federally recognized Native American tribe. The school is located in Park Hill, Oklahoma, with a Tahlequah post office address, and is a Bureau of Indian Education (BIE) grant school operated by the Cherokee Nation.

Sequoyah is one of two boarding high schools for Native Americans in Oklahoma.  It is a part of Sequoyah Schools.

Background
Sequoyah Schools also has an elementary school grades pre-school through 8. Students in pre-school through grade 6 at the Cherokee Immersion School learn in  Cherokee then begin to transition to instruction in English in grade 5.

In 2007 Jeff Raymond of The Oklahoman stated that the school was known to ethnic Cherokee people living throughout the United States.

History
The school was founded in 1871 by the Cherokee National Council as the Cherokee Orphan Asylum to care for the numerous orphans who came out of the American Civil War. The first building on the current site of the school was erected in 1875.

The Cherokee National Council gave permission for acting Chief William Charles Rogers to sell the property (which included  plus the buildings) to the United States Department of the Interior for a sum of $5,000 in 1914. In 1925, the name of the school was changed to Sequoyah Orphan Training School to memorialize Sequoyah, a noted Cherokee who invented the Cherokee syllabary.

For a short time, the school was also known as Sequoyah Vocational School. During much of its early years, the school boasted an active dairy and various other farming and agricultural facilities. It was operated by the Bureau of Indian Affairs as a boarding school until 1985.

In November 1985 the Cherokee Nation resumed operations at Sequoyah High School from the Bureau of Indian Affairs and now operates under a grant.  The school now maintains  of land and more than a dozen major buildings five miles (8 km) southwest of Tahlequah, Oklahoma.

Jolyn Choate began working as principal circa 2012.

In 2020 the school had a lack of teachers who focused on mathematics and science.

Patrick Moore served as the superintendent until he resigned in 2020.

Campus

In 2003 its cafeteria had a capacity of 280 and the overall campus was designed for about 300 students.

The dormitories are only open to students at the high school levels.

Admissions and operations
In order to be admitted a student must possess a Certificate of Degree of Indian Blood to show membership in a Federally Recognized Tribe.  there are no other hard requirements for attending.

In 2007 Raymond stated that the school had competitive admissions with a wait list and that "today's students clamor to get into Sequoyah".

The tribal government and the BIE fully finance the school's operations, so no tuition charges are levied against students.

Curriculum
The school has specialized courses pertaining to the Cherokee people, including those on the tribe's history, the arts, the Cherokee language and other aspects of the tribal culture. As of 2007 the State of Oklahoma requires each high school student to complete 23 credits, but the school requires each of its students to complete 28.

Demographics
School enrollment is approximately 430 students, with 47% male and 53% female students. The teacher-student ratio is 1:15. 100% of the student population is American Indian, compared to Oklahoma's state average of 18% American Indian students.

In 2007 there were 436 students, with over 100 living on campus. In 2006 there were 360 students.

In 2003 there were 363 students, which at the time was an enrollment high. These students originated from 16 states, and were members of 39 tribes. At the time the campus was built to accommodate about 300 students.

Athletics
The mascot is the Indian. Circa September 2005 there were rumors that the school would change the name of the mascot to the eagle. Chad Smith, the Principal Chief of the tribe, issued an executive order stating that the mascot would remain the same so long as the school board agrees. In 2006 Gina Stanley, the superintendent of Cherokee Schools, stated that the mascot has a positive reception among the students.

State championships
Sequoyah High School has won 21 state championships in seven sports:

Powerlifting – 2016

Boys Basketball – 2003

Girls Basketball – 2005, 2006, 2007, 2015, 2017, 2018

Boys Cross Country – 1964, 1965, 1969, 1993, 1995, 2003, 2004, 2005, 2006

Girls Cross Country – 1992, 2005

Slow Pitch Softball – 2012

Fast Pitch Softball – 2018

Notable alumni
Angel Goodrich, WNBA basketball player
Jackson Narcomey, painter and printmaker
Nathan Stanley, American football player
Ryan Helsley, pitcher for the St. Louis Cardinals

See also
 Off-reservation boarding schools operated by the BIE
 Chemawa Indian School
 Flandreau Indian School
 Riverside Indian School
 Sherman Indian High School
 Off-reservation boarding schools operated by tribes
 Circle of Nations Wahpeton Indian School
 Pierre Indian Learning Center

References

External links
 Sequoyah High School
 
 

Educational institutions established in 1871
Cherokee Nation buildings and structures
Boarding schools in Oklahoma
Public high schools in Oklahoma
Schools in Cherokee County, Oklahoma
Native American boarding schools
Public middle schools in Oklahoma
1871 establishments in Indian Territory
Buildings and structures in Tahlequah, Oklahoma
Public boarding schools in the United States
Native American history of Oklahoma